Ampera Bridge (for  [Mandate of People's Suffering], a now-rarely used colloquial name for the preamble of the Constitution of Indonesia), formerly Bung Karno Bridge (after President Sukarno) between its opening and the 1966 De-Sukarnoization campaign, is a vertical-lift bridge in the city of Palembang, South Sumatra, Indonesia. It connects Seberang Ulu and Seberang Ilir, two regions of Palembang. It can no longer be opened to allow ships to pass.

The bridge was planned during the era of Indonesia's first president, Sukarno, who wanted a bridge that could open and be a match for London's Tower Bridge. The funds for the construction came from Japanese war reparations, with Fuji Heavy Industries being given responsibility for design and construction. However, at the time, Japan had no bridges of this type, and Fuji Heavy Industries had no bridge-building experience. The official opening was carried out by Governor of South Sumatra, Abujazid Bustomi, on 10 November 1965. At first, the bridge was known as the Bung Karno Bridge, after the president, but following his fall, it was renamed the Ampera Bridge.

For a few years after it was opened, the centre span could be lifted at a speed of approximately 10 metres per minute to allow ships of up to 44.5m in height to pass underneath. However, this only occurred a few times, and after 1970 it could no longer be opened. The official reason for this was that the 30 minutes needed to raise the bridge was causing unacceptable delays, and that in any case silting of the river had made it impassable for large ships. However, according to architect Wiratman, who acted as a consultant before the construction, the design of the bridge was flawed from the outset because of the soft mud on which it was built. He maintains that his concerns were ignored for political reasons, and that as the towers' foundations shifted, the bridge deformed to the extent that it could no longer be opened. The ballast weights needed to balance the weight of the bridge were removed in 1990 to prevent possible accidents were they to fall.

The bridge's colour has been changed three times. At first it was grey, but it was changed to be yellow in 1992. And in 2002, when Indonesia was led by Megawati Sukarnoputri as president, the colour was changed again to red.

See also 
 Ampera LRT station

References 

Bridges in Indonesia
Buildings and structures in Palembang
Bridges completed in 1965
Post-independence architecture of Indonesia
Vertical lift bridges